Episoriculus is a genus of shrew in the red-toothed shrew subfamily. Its common is brown-toothed shrew. It has been described as a subgenus to Soriculus in the past. The genus occurs at a number of locations in Asia, including Nepal and China.

Species
Currently, the four identified species of the genus Episoriculus include:
Hodgson's brown-toothed shrew (E. caudatus)
E. c.  sacratus
E. c.  umbrinus
Taiwanese brown-toothed shrew (E. fumidus)
Long-tailed brown-toothed shrew (E. leucops)
E. l.  leucops
E. l.  baileyi
Long-tailed mountain shrew (E. macrurus)

References

Further reading

A guide to the mammals of China.
Checklist of Palaearctic and Indian Mammals 1758 to 1946. British Museum (Natural History), 19 1951: pp. 810. (Zoological Record Volume 88)

Red-toothed shrews
Mammal genera